Stenochilus hobsoni is a species of spiders in the genus Stenochilus.

References

Araneomorphae
Spiders of Asia
Spiders described in 1871